Realis is the third studio album by A Hope for Home. It was released on March 30, 2010 through Facedown Records.

Writing and recording
The band began the writing for Realis in September 2009 in a practice space in Beaverton, Oregon. Written in half the time of their previous album, The Everlasting Man, Realis was "a lot more focused and cohesive".

Speaking of the album, guitarist and vocalist Matthew Ellis stated:

Ellis also stated:

The album was recorded throughout January 2010 at the "Red Room Studios" in Seattle, WA and at "Robots Ate My Studio" in Camas, Washington. For the drum tracking and mixing of the record, A Hope for Home recruited the help of drummer Chris Common (These Arms Are Snakes). Ellis stated, "Chris is such an amazing producer and it was such a blessing to be able to work with him. He runs a studio in Seattle with my favorite producer, Matt Bayles, and those guys have done records by bands like Botch and Isis, and it was insane to work with them".

Track listing

Personnel
A Hope for Home
 Nathan Winchell – vocals 
 Matthew Ellis – guitar, vocals
 Tanner Morita – guitar 
 Dan McCall – bass
 Lance Taylor – drums
 Eric Gerrard - keyboard, programming

Additional musicians
 Jacek Gillespie - vocals on "First Light of Dawn"

Production
 Produced by Dan McCall
 Vocals, guitars, and pianos recorded by Dan McCall
 Drum tracking and mixing by Chris Common
 Mastered by Troy Glessner

Artwork
 Art direction A Hope for Home
 Art design by Tanner Morita

References

2010 albums
A Hope for Home albums
Facedown Records albums